Paraxestis is a genus of moths of the family Nolidae. The genus was erected by George Hampson in 1902.

Species
Paraxestis malagasy Viette, 1988
Paraxestis rufescens Hampson, 1902

References

Chloephorinae